Vertex is a studio album by Canadian hip hop musician Buck 65.

Reception
Mark Pytlik of AllMusic gave Vertex 4 stars out of 5, calling it "an inadvertent paean to the possibilities of imagination and innovation."

Track listing

References

Further reading

External links
 

1997 albums
Buck 65 albums